Emma Misak, also known as Emma, is a Canadian olympic breakdancer. She participated at the 2018 Summer Youth Olympics in the dancesport competition, being awarded the silver medal in the B-Girls' event.

References

External links 

Living people
Place of birth missing (living people)
Year of birth missing (living people)
Canadian breakdancers
Breakdancers at the 2018 Summer Youth Olympics
Medalists at the 2018 Summer Youth Olympics
Youth Olympic silver medalists for Canada